The 1936 Boston University Terriers football team was an American football team that represented Boston University as an independent during the 1936 college football season. In its third season under head coach Pat Hanley, the team compiled a 5–1–2 record and outscored opponents by a total of 87 to 39.

Schedule

References

Boston University
Boston University Terriers football seasons
Boston University Terriers football